Up to our Necks is an unauthorized documentary film on the American heavy metal band Slipknot. The unrated biography shows never-before-seen interviews with the band members, but does not have live footage nor music by the band.

References

External links

American documentary films
Documentary films about the arts
Slipknot (band)